Eremophila coacta is a flowering plant in the figwort family, Scrophulariaceae and is endemic to a small area in the north west of Western Australia. It is an erect shrub with narrow, sticky, pointed leaves and densely hairy light to dark lilac-coloured flowers.

Description
The younger stems are sticky with resin which gradually dries to a brown and flaky layer.

The sepals are glabrous on their outer surface but densely hairy with prominent transparent glands on the inner surface. The petal tube is light to dark lilac-coloured and densely hairy while the inside of the tube is densely woolly. The 4 stamens are fully enclosed in the petal tube.

Taxonomy and naming
The species was first formally described by Robert Chinnock in 2007 and the description was published in Eremophila and Allied Genera: A Monograph of the Plant Family Myoporaceae. The specific epithet (coacta) is a Latin word meaning "felted" referring to the surface of the petal tube.

Distribution and habitat
Eremophila coacta occurs in the area between Ashburton Downs, Mount Vernon and Paraburdoo in the Gascoyne and Pilbara biogeographic regions where it grows in laterite and shale soils on ironstone hills and along creek lines.

Conservation status
Eremophila coacta is classified as "Priority Three" by the Government of Western Australia Department of Parks and Wildlife meaning that it is poorly known and known from only a few locations but is not under imminent threat.

References

coacta
Eudicots of Western Australia
Plants described in 2007
Endemic flora of Western Australia